The John Larroquette Show is an American sitcom television series that aired on NBC from September 2, 1993, until October 30, 1996.  Created by Don Reo, the show was a star vehicle for John Larroquette following his run as Dan Fielding on Night Court.  The series takes place in a seedy bus terminal in St. Louis, Missouri, and originally focused on the somewhat broken people who worked the night shift, and in particular, the lead character's battle with alcoholism.  The series was produced by Reo's Impact Zone Productions, Larroquette's Port Street Films and Witt/Thomas Productions in association with Warner Bros. Television.

NBC canceled the series after airing only six episodes in season 4.

After 26 years of being off-air, The John Larroquette Show has returned to broadcast, re-running in the US on "Rewind TV" since January 9, 2022. But only the first three seasons are complete. 401, 402, 403, 404 and 406 are the only season four episodes being re-run.

Plot
John Hemingway, recovering alcoholic, has been appointed to the role of night shift manager of the St. Louis bus depot. He must deal not only with the intricacies of keeping the station running smoothly, but also the employees and other personalities who frequent the station, all while dealing with his own demons. This was highlighted in the first episode, with a running gag of every character offering to buy him a drink upon his meeting them.

Most of the first season dealt with John's attempts to stay sober, with episodes representing each of the AA program's Twelve Steps.  John constantly struggled to maintain control of the station, with regular conflicts with his secretary, Mahalia, the janitor, Heavy Gene, and most strongly with sandwich bar attendant Dexter, who had been turned down for the position to which John was appointed.  Adding sexual tension to John's life was high class escort Carly, who was a friend of Dexter's.

Beginning with the second season, Hemingway (and the entire cast) changed from the night shift to the daytime hours, and the alcoholism sub-plot was de-emphasized.

Cast
The show was unusual for occasionally addressing issues of race through a multiracial cast, unlike most American sitcoms in the 1990s.

John Larroquette as John Hemingway
Liz Torres as Mahalia Sanchez, John's secretary
Gigi Rice as Carly Watkins, a high class escort and friend of Dexter's
Daryl "Chill" Mitchell as Dexter Walker, the depot's sandwich bar attendant and John's rival
Chi McBride as Heavy Gene, a janitor at the depot
Lenny Clarke as Officer Adam Hampton
Elizabeth Berridge as Officer Eve Eggers
Alison LaPlaca as Catherine Merrick (1994–1996)
John F. O'Donohue as Max Dumas (1993–1994)
Bill Morey as Oscar (1994–1996)
Jazzmun as Pat (occasional, 1993–1995)

Recurring role
David Crosby as Chester, John's AA sponsor.
Omri Katz as Tony Hemingway, John's son.  Katz would be replaced in an unaired fourth-season episode with Ryan Reynolds.
Mayim Bialik as Rachel, John's daughter
Ted McGinley as Karl Reese, Carly's boyfriend and future ex-husband

Over the course of its run, the show also featured cameos from a number of celebrities. Betty White, Rue McClanahan and Estelle Getty played themselves in a Golden Girls/Sunset Boulevard inspired episode. Fellow Night Court actors Harry Anderson, Charles Robinson, and Marsha Warfield each appeared in an episode.  Composer of the shows first two seasons's theme song, David Cassidy falls down drunk in the bus station near the end of season 2. June Lockhart and Richard Mulligan appeared in separate episodes as John's parents. Boyz II Men appeared in a 1994 episode that saw their tour bus break down at John's station. Joe Pesci, Richard S. "Kinky" Friedman, Dennis Miller, George Hamilton and Ray Charles also appeared playing themselves in episodes.

Other notable guest appearances included Bobcat Goldthwait, Matthew Perry, Dick Martin, Phil Hartman, Rip Torn, Jane Lynch, Tim Daly, Marion Ross, Donna Mills, Art LaFleur, Joey Lawrence, Molly Shannon, Philip Baker Hall, Len Lesser, Deezer D, Cheryl Tiegs, Dinah Manoff and Mila Kunis.

Episodes

Season 1 (1993–94)

Season 2 (1994–95)

Season 3 (1995–96)

Season 4 (1996)

History

Despite receiving early favorable critical reviews, the first season finished 96th overall, in part due to its time slot opposing Roseanne (which was fourth overall during the same season). By Larroquette's own admission, though, the show's first season wasn't prime-time material due to its dark nature – at least not for network television.

The show faced cancellation, until Larroquette requested the chance to retool the series, which NBC granted. Much of the dark humor was removed, for a more "toned-down" feel. The sets were brighter, and the cast were transferred from the night shift to day. John's dingy bed-sit was traded for a nice apartment. Oscar, the old bum who lived in one of the bus station phone booths, was cleaned up and became a shoeshine, and the prostitute character Carly (Gigi Rice) went "straight" – buying the bar and becoming a model citizen. The producers also gave John a wholesome romantic interest in the form of nurse Catherine Merrick, played by Alison LaPlaca. The series continued in this more prime-time-friendly format for two more years.

TV Ratings
Season 1
Ep 1: 14.3 rating [series high]
Ep 2: 12.5 rating
Ep 3: 10 rating
Ep 4: 9.6 rating
Ep 6: 13.3 million viewers; 9.3 rating 
Ep 10: 10.9 rating
Ep 17: 12.3 rating
Ep 24: 8.9 rating

Season 2
Ep 1: 16.4 million viewers; 11.4 rating 
Ep 2: 11.2 rating
Ep 3: 12.5 rating
Ep 4: 10.9 rating
Ep 21: 11.5 rating
Ep 24: 9.8 rating

Season 3
Ep 1: 7.4 rating
Ep 4: 5.8 rating [series low]
Ep 10: 13.1 rating
Ep 11: 12.4 rating
Ep 21: 11.2 rating
Ep 24: 10.3 rating

Season 4
Ep 1: 8.3 rating
Ep 2: 6.6 rating
Ep 6: 7 rating

Decline and cancellation
In an attempt to boost the third season opener, but without increasing the budget, it featured a faux guest appearance by Kelsey Grammer as Dr. Frasier Crane, whom John calls for advice (not knowing he is on Frasier's live radio program). Ratings did not improve, however. John and Carly got married in the third-season finale while Catherine was seemingly pregnant with John's child. It was revealed that Catherine was experiencing a phantom pregnancy and left the show. The John Larroquette Show was cancelled abruptly one month into its fourth season, the last episode airing on October 30, 1996, showing John and Officer Eggers on a date at a Halloween party. Six episodes remained unaired until being shown on the USA Network years later.

Production
The series was originally to be called Crossroads; however, NBC wished to make the most of John Larroquette's popularity from his previous role on Night Court, and insisted on naming the show after him.

The show was videotaped, but processed by NBC to make it look like it was recorded on film. Reruns on other networks had the show in its original videotaped format.

Theme song
The series' theme song, "The Skrewy St. Louis Blues", is a bluesy tune performed by David Cassidy on acoustic guitar with a scat vocal. A version of the performance lasting approximately one minute was used in the opening and closing sequences of the show during its first season. A much shorter edit of the song (lasting less than ten seconds) was heard only during the opening logo during the later seasons. An upbeat, jazzy instrumental tune was occasionally used for the closing theme in seasons three and four.

Steve Cochran, a former radio host on WGN Radio in Chicago, used the Cassidy song as the theme music for his own radio program up until he was fired.

Critical reception
The Los Angeles Times once referred to the series as "sitcom noir".

The show was nominated and won several technical awards over its four-year run, and Larroquette was nominated in 1994 for Primetime Emmy Award for Outstanding Lead Actor in a Comedy Series. Guest star Betty White won the Primetime Emmy Award for Outstanding Guest Actress in a Comedy Series in 1996 for her appearance in the Season 3 episode "Here We Go Again".

Liz Torres, also nominated in 1994 for the Primetime Emmy Award for Outstanding Supporting Actress in a Comedy Series, won the NCLR/ALMA Award for Outstanding Individual Performance in a Comedy Series in 1996 for her role in the series. She would also win a Nosotros Golden Eagle Award for Outstanding Actress in a Television Series in 1997.

Thomas Pynchon
After the series made several references to reclusive novelist Thomas Pynchon's work and reputation, Pynchon (through his agent) reportedly contacted the series' producers to offer suggestions and corrections. When a local Pynchon sighting became a major plot point in a 1994 episode of the series, Pynchon was sent the script for his approval; as well as providing the title of a fictitious work to be used in one episode ("Pandemonium of the Sun"), the novelist apparently vetoed a final scene that called for an extra playing him to be filmed from behind, walking away from the shot. Pynchon also insisted that it should be specifically mentioned in the episode that Pynchon was seen wearing a T-shirt showing psychedelic-rock musician Roky Erickson. According to the Los Angeles Times, this spurred an increase in sales of Erickson's albums.

References

External links

1990s American sitcoms
1990s American workplace comedy television series
1993 American television series debuts
1996 American television series endings
English-language television shows
NBC original programming
Television shows set in St. Louis
Television series by Warner Bros. Television Studios
Primetime Emmy Award-winning television series
Super Bowl lead-out shows
Television series created by Don Reo
Alcohol abuse in television
1990s American black comedy television series
Works about bus transport